Thomas Tierney (30 October 1894 – 25 March 1984) was an Irish hurler. Usually lining out as a corner-back, he was a substitute on the Kilkenny senior hurling team that won the 1922 All-Ireland Championship.

Honours

Kilkenny
All-Ireland Senior Hurling Championship (1): 1922
Leinster Senior Hurling Championship (1): 1922

References

1894 births
1984 deaths
Hurling backs
John Locke's hurlers
Kilkenny inter-county hurlers